The Roman Catholic Archdiocese of Ibagué is an archdiocese located in the city of Ibagué in Colombia.

History
 20 May 1900: Established as Diocese of Ibagué from the Diocese of Tolima
 14 December 1974: Promoted as Metropolitan Archdiocese of Ibagué

Bishops
 Bishops of Ibagué 
Ismael Perdomo Borrero † (8 Jun 1903 – 5 Feb 1923) Appointed, Coadjutor Archbishop of Bogotá
Pedro María Rodríguez Andrade † (10 Apr 1924 – 17 Mar 1957) Retired
Arturo Duque Villegas † (17 Mar 1957 – 7 Jul 1959) Appointed, Archbishop of Manizales
Rubén Isaza Restrepo † (2 Nov 1959  – 3 Jan 1964) Appointed, Coadjutor Archbishop of Bogotá
José Joaquín Flórez Hernández † (17 March 1964 – 14 Dec 1974 see below)
 Archbishops of Ibagué 
José Joaquín Flórez Hernández † (see above 14 Dec 1974 – 25 Mar 1993) Retired
Juan Francisco Sarasti Jaramillo, C.I.M. (25 Mar 1993 – 17 Aug 2002) Appointed, Archbishop of Cali
Flavio Calle Zapata (10 Jan 2003 – 19 March 2019)
Orlando Roa Barbosa (29 May 2020 -)

Auxiliary bishops
Arturo Duque Villegas † (1949-1957), appointed Bishop here
Fabián Marulanda López (1986-1989), appointed Bishop of Florencia
Orlando Roa Barbosa (2012-2015), appointed Bishop of Espinal; later returned here as Archbishop
Miguel Fernando González Mariño (2016-)

Suffragan dioceses
 Espinal 
 Garzón
 Líbano–Honda
 Neiva

See also
Roman Catholicism in Colombia

Sources

External links
 Catholic Hierarchy

 GCatholic.org

Roman Catholic dioceses in Colombia
Roman Catholic Ecclesiastical Province of Ibagué
Christian organizations established in 1900
Roman Catholic dioceses and prelatures established in the 19th century